The 2013 Cincinnati Bearcats football team represented the University of Cincinnati in the 2013 NCAA Division I FBS football season.  The Bearcat football team played their home games at Nippert Stadium in Cincinnati, Ohio. The 2013 college football season was their first season as a member of the American Athletic Conference. The Bearcats were led by first year head coach Tommy Tuberville. They finished the season 9–4, 6–2 in American Athletic play to finish in third place. They were invited to the Belk Bowl where they lost to North Carolina.

Schedule

Game summaries

Purdue

Illinois

Northwestern State

Miami, OH

South Florida

Temple

UConn

Memphis

SMU

Rutgers

Houston

Louisville

Roster

Depth chart
.

Awards and milestones

American Athletic Conference honors

Offensive player of the week
Week 7: Brendon Kay
Week 13: Brendon Kay

Defensive player of the week
Week 10: Zach Edwards

American Athletic Conference All-Conference First Team

Eric Lefeld, OT
Blake Annen, TE
Ralph David Abernathy IV, RS

Jordan Stepp, DL

American Athletic Conference All-Conference Second Team

Anthony McClung, WR
Sam Longo, OG

Silverberry Mouhon, DL
Greg Blair, LB
Deven Drane, CB

Rankings

References

Cincinnati
Cincinnati Bearcats football seasons
Cincinnati Bearcats football